Swimming in Champagne is the debut studio album by American singer Eric Heatherly, released in 2000. 

The album contains a cover of "Flowers on the Wall", originally recorded by the Statler Brothers in 1965. Heatherly's cover was released as the album's lead-off single, peaking at number 6 on the Billboard Hot Country Singles & Tracks (now Hot Country Songs) chart and number 50 on the Billboard Hot 100. The second and third singles were the title track and "Wrong Five O'Clock", which respectively reached numbers 46 and 32 on the country chart. The album peaked at number 157 on the Billboard 200.

Production
The album was produced by Keith Stegall. Heatherly cowrote every song aside from the Statler Brothers cover.

Critical reception
Country Standard Time wrote that "the barroom anthems are tempered by the beautiful title ballad and the first single, a reworking of the Statler Brothers classic, 'Flowers On The Wall', that is different enough to succeed in the face of the original." The Morning Call thought that "trafficking in typical rock-country hybrids, this freshly minted singer-songwriter pens tunes that tell a story, not unlike, say, John Mellencamp, Tom Petty or Johnny Cash."

Track listing

Eric Heatherly's band
Richard E. Carpenter – drums
Jonathan Hamby – keyboards
Eric Heatherly – lead vocals, electric guitar
Jim Roller – bass guitar

Additional musicians
Randy McCormick – keyboards
Gary Prim – piano
John Wesley Ryles – background vocals
John Willis – acoustic guitar
Glenn Worf – bass guitar

Chart performance

References

2000 debut albums
Albums produced by Keith Stegall
Eric Heatherly albums
Mercury Nashville albums